Bard High School Early College (BHSEC) is an early college school, with multiple campuses in the United States. The school allows students to begin their college studies two years early, graduating with a Bard College Associate in Arts degree in addition to their high school diploma. Students complete their high school studies in the ninth and tenth grade, after which point they begin taking credit-bearing college courses under the same roof. Unlike some dual-enrollment programs, students stay on the same campus for all four years, and both high school- and college-level courses are taught by the same faculty. Teachers at the Bard High School Early Colleges are both certified public school teachers as well as experienced academic scholars, often holding terminal degrees in their areas of study.

The original campus, Bard High School Early College Manhattan, opened in New York City in 2001 as a partnership between Bard College and various local public school systems. There are currently six Bard High School Early College campuses across the country: BHSEC Manhattan, which opened in 2001, is located in the Lower East Side, Manhattan; BHSEC Queens, which opened in 2008, is located in Long Island City; BHSEC Newark, which opened 2011, is located in Newark, New Jersey; BHSEC Cleveland and BHSEC Cleveland East, which opened in 2014 and 2017, respectively, are located in Cleveland, Ohio; and BHSEC Baltimore, which opened in 2015, is located in Baltimore, Maryland.

The Bard High School Early Colleges are part of a larger network of early college programs run by Bard College, called the Bard Early Colleges, which also include half-day programs in New Orleans, Louisiana; in partnership with the Harlem Children's Zone in New York City; and in Hudson, New York.

Admissions
BHSEC has a conventional admissions process; simply apply through NBOE'S School mint and select Bard Highschool Early College (BHSEC). Applicants must maintain a B letter grade of 85 percent or higher in order to be considered. Bard has its own academic standards, and if a student meets them, they will be called to a one-on-one interview.

History
Founded in 2001 as a partnership of the New York City Department of Education and Bard College and funded in part by the Bill and Melinda Gates Foundation, Bard High School Early College Manhattan was the first public Bard Early College. However, the early college model and many of the teaching philosophies employed across the Bard Early Colleges were primarily developed at Bard College at Simon's Rock, the oldest early college entrance program and only accredited four-year early college to date.

BHSEC Manhattan was the first school in the Gates Foundation's Early College High School Initiative, which aims to improve education, in the United States, by introducing smaller public high schools which help remove the barriers to a college education by offering students a college education in a high school setting.

As of June 2016, over 2,500 A.A. degrees have been awarded across all BHSEC campuses. The schools boast a 98% high school graduation rate and a 95% A.A. degree attainment rate. Many graduates of BHSEC transfer their 60+ college credits to another college or university and finish their Bachelor of Arts (B.A.) degree in two more years; others opt to study for three or four years in their subsequent institutions. According to the National Student Clearinghouse, the six-year B.A. attainment rate for the classes of 2005-2009 was 98%.

School structure

High school (9th & 10th grades)
In the BHSEC program, students spend what is traditionally ninth and tenth grade finishing the bulk of their high school work. Students are encouraged to take all required state testing by the end of 10th grade, when possible – in New York City, students take the five Regents exams required for the High School Regents diploma, which they receive in addition to the Associates of Arts degree from Bard College. Unlike most public high schools, however, BHSEC does not offer courses tailored to prepare students for state tests, nor are there any Advanced Placement (AP) or International Baccalaureate (IB) courses offered (as the last two years are already spent in an accredited college program). In order to complete the high school curriculum in two years, courses are taught at an accelerated pace.

BHSEC does not rank its students and does not honor titles such as Valedictorian, nor does it implement a Dean's list.

Early College Program (11th & 12th grades)
The two years spent, in the college program, are denoted "Year 1" and "Year 2." As a college program, students may select their courses based primarily on their academic interests and preferences for certain professors; however, they must also meet the college program's core requirements. These requirements include four semesters of the Bard Seminar, in which students read and discuss seminal works of western thought, from Plato and the classics through Shakespeare and ending in postmodernism. Students are also required to complete two semesters of math, two semesters of laboratory science, one semester of a U.S. history course, one semester of a world history course, two semesters of literature, and two semesters of a foreign language (at least one at intermediate level) and three arts credits. Students may also create their own courses with the independent study program, provided that a faculty member is knowledgeable in the subject, awarding one to three credits, depending on the amount of college-level reading completed. Every semester, a student must take 14-18 credits. With permission from the dean, students may take more than 18 credits in a semester. Students can also transfer credits from other universities to meet their requirements for the college program.

BHSEC's college program offers classes that are more specialized than in the high school program, such as linear algebra, reason and politics, novels of Dostoyevsky, philosophy of religion, physics of sound and music, the social contract and its critics, criminal law through literature, and culture and history of food. These courses are taught by college professors, many of whom have published books and articles in their fields. Across campuses, college course offering are based on the interest and expertise of the faculty members.

Writing and Thinking Workshop 
Across all of Bard College's campuses and programs, the school year begins with a week-long Writing and Thinking Workshop. Students spend each day engaging in critical reading, writing, and thinking exercises, which are employed in the classroom throughout the school year. It is an opportunity to introduce new students to and re-familiarize current students with BHSEC's academic environment.

Across disciplines, teaching at the Bard Early Colleges employs practices developed at the Bard Institute for Writing and Thinking to advance the philosophy that “Writing is both a record of completed thought and an exploratory process that supports teaching and learning across disciplines. At all levels writing allows the writer to discover what she or he wants to say.” Students and their teachers write together using various classroom exercises and teaching methods to respond to texts reflecting diverse genres, voices, and perspectives. This written dialog then becomes the basis for classroom discussion.

Campuses

Bard High School Early Colleges (4-year) 

 Bard High School Early College Manhattan
 Bard High School Early College Queens
 Bard High School Early College Newark
 Bard High School Early College Cleveland
 Bard High School Early College Cleveland East
 Bard High School Early College Baltimore
 Bard High School Early College DC

Other Bard Early College programs (Half-day) 

 Bard Early College New Orleans
 Bard Early College at the Harlem Children's Zone
 Bard Early College Hudson

Recognition
In 2009, President Barack Obama singled out BHSEC as the model for the future in his Centennial Speech to the NAACP:

We also have to explore innovative approaches such as those being pursued here in New York City; innovations like Bard High School Early College and Medgar Evers College Preparatory School that are challenging students to complete high school and earn a free associate's degree or college credit in just four years.

Notable alumni
Audrey Gelman

See also
 Education in New York City

References

External links
 
 The Bardvark
 BQ Broadside

Bard College
Alternative education
University-affiliated schools in the United States
Public high schools in Manhattan
Long Island City
Lower East Side
High schools in Newark, New Jersey
Educational institutions established in 2001
2001 establishments in New York City
Public high schools in Queens, New York